Barroway Drove is a village in the parish of Stow Bardolph in Norfolk, England. For the purposes of local government, it falls within the district of King's Lynn and West Norfolk. Barroway Drove was referred to as  Bardolph Fen.

The village lies on the eastern edge of The Fens and is notable for its lack of amenities and poor quality roads.

Barroway Drove Village Hall is the central hub of the community. It is the venue of the weekly parent and toddler group called Little Gems, and also takes on the role of polling station on election days.

In 2007, Stephen Fry filmed a number of scenes for his popular ITV television series Kingdom in the village.

Further reading

War Memorial
In 2018, Barroway Drove unveiled a new memorial plaque in the Village Hall to commemorate the fallen. The names for the First World War are listed as:
 Lance-Corporal Frederick W. Towson (d.1918), 9th Battalion, Royal Fusiliers
 Gunner William Cave (1894-1916), 78th Brigade, Royal Field Artillery
 Private Herbert J. Croxford (d.1917), 2nd Battalion, Bedfordshire Regiment
 Private William Whybrow (d.1918), 2nd Battalion, Royal Fusiliers
 Private Ralph E. Smith (1897-1917), 9th Battalion, Royal Norfolk Regiment
 Private George H. Fisher (1895-1918), 2nd Battalion, Suffolk Regiment
 Private Frederick Height (d.1916), 11th Battalion, Suffolk Regiment
 Private Simon Hubbard (1881-1918), 1st Battalion, Queen's Own Royal West Kent Regiment
 Ordinary-Seaman Thomas W. Sutton
 Private George W. Brown
 Private Jesse Crofts
 Private Herbert J. Hudson
 Private Charles Nicholls
 Private John T. Smith
 Private Robert Turner

And, the following deaths from a No. 608 Squadron RAFMosquito crash after take-off from RAF Downham Market during the Second World War:
 Flying-Officer Oswald C. Sweetman (1917-1944)
 Flight-Lieutenant Reginald G. Gardner (1913-1944)

And, the following names from an American B17 Flying Fortress of 379th BG, 525 Squadron which crashed in the village following a mid-air explosion. They are listed as:
 Second-Lieutenant John Daly, Jr.
 Second-Lieutenant Robert W. Koerber
 Staff-Sergeant Carl B. Christenson
 Staff-Sergeant Frank J. Hearne
 Staff-Sergeant John N. M. I. MacCallum
 Staff-Sergeant Harold J. Polizze
 Staff-Sergeant Harvey W. Tuber
 Technical-Sergeant Engineer Adriel W. Langendoerfer
 Technical-Sergeant Omer L. Young

References

External links
 Barroway Drove Village Website
 History of Barroway Drove Website

Villages in Norfolk
Stow Bardolph